Budimorovo is a rural locality (a village) in Nikolskoye Rural Settlement, Kaduysky District, Vologda Oblast, Russia. The population was 10 as of 2002.

Geography 
Budimorovo is located 28 km north of Kaduy (the district's administrative centre) by road. Nikonovskaya is the nearest rural locality.

References 

Rural localities in Kaduysky District